Cuevas del Campo is a municipality located in the province of Granada, Spain. According to the 2006 census (INE), the city has a population of 2073 inhabitants.
In the north east corner of the Granada Province and at around 130 kilometres from 
Granada City (home of the Alhambra), Cuevas del Campo is one of the 
six picturesque villages that make up the area of Baza in the Altiplano region. It covers 97 km2 and has a population of approximately 2,500.

It lies in between the Sierra de Baza and the Sierra de Cazorla.

Cuevas del Campo is the youngest of the municipalities in the Baza region, having been formed in 1980. The population is approximately 2,500 and the inhabitants are known as ’cueveños’. The village economy is basically agricultural, with a strong emphasis on olives.

History
Over many years there have been disputes between the towns of Pozo Alcón (Jaén Province) and Zújar (Granada Province) regarding the boundaries of these two municipalities. The result of a long legal wrangle ended up with the dividing of the territory into three parts, one of which was El Retamar (which is now Cuevas del Campo). Over 30 years the people of Cuevas del Campo wanted segregation from Zújar (which is situated some 20 kilometres away). This was finally granted on 21 November 1980, when Cuevas del Campo finally became an independently constituted municipality.

Climate
As with the other villages in the Altiplano area the summers are long and dry, with cooler evenings than many other parts of Andalusia. The winters can bring cold fresh days and sometimes snow, but often coupled with bright sunshine.

Fiestas
Semana Santa (Easter Holy Week) is a special time in most of Andalusia. It is particularly interesting in Cuevas del Campo because since the year 2001, they have had the special added attraction of ‘Semana Santa Viviente’ where professionals and other villagers act out various parts of the Passion of Christ, including crucifixion and resurrection.

On the 15h and 16 May there is a festival in honour of San Isidro. The Town Hall organises various events. Floats are decked out and the people wear traditional dress and a communal picnic takes place, all in honour of the Saint.

In August (15th and 16th) there is the August fair. There are many local events, including a canoe race, which was first introduced in 1997 and has been a great success ever since.

At the beginning of October is the Fiesta of the Santo Angel. Many years ago there was a terrible plague of locusts and it is said that the Saint was taken out, with the people in procession behind and walked through the village. Apparently this drove away the locusts and so each year this fiesta is celebrated in thanks.

Handcrafts
In times gone by, objects hand-woven from dried grasses, for household use were used in every home. Rush matting and other objects were necessary for every day living. Nowadays, it is the older people who still have the skills to hand weave such items. Baskets, mats, fans, bottle carriers, etc. were all simply essential utensils for everyday life, while now they are also sold as decorative items or souvenirs to visitors. There was also local pottery and tile production at one time, which has disappeared with modern times. However, hand-made embroidery and also crochet work is experiencing somewhat of a revival.

Gastronomy
Home-cooked meats such as pork, lamb, chicken and rabbit are the base of many of the local dishes, which normally include delicious, locally grown vegetables, pulses and cereals. The recipes are a mix of Arabic and Spanish styles as a result of past influences in the area and most dishes are fairly hearty since this is a hard working agricultural people who live through cold winters. Locally produced prepared, cold meats are a must to try, as well as "patatas a lo pobre" (‘poor man’s potatoes’) – potatoes cooked in olive oil, with onions and green peppers - served with many main dishes.

References

Municipalities in the Province of Granada